Katsuichi Mori (26 December 1929 – 2 September 2011) was a Japanese diver. He competed in two events at the 1952 Summer Olympics.

References

External links
 
 

1929 births
2011 deaths
Japanese male divers
Olympic divers of Japan
Divers at the 1952 Summer Olympics
Place of birth missing
Asian Games gold medalists for Japan
Asian Games silver medalists for Japan
Divers at the 1954 Asian Games
Asian Games medalists in diving
Medalists at the 1954 Asian Games
20th-century Japanese people